The Van Leer family, originally spelled Von Lohr, is an influential German-American family that emigrated to the Province of Pennsylvania in the 17th century from the Electorate of Hesse near Isenberg, Germany. The family made their fortune in the United States through the ironworks business.

Notable family members
Bernardhus Van Leer (1687-1790), physician and early settler of the Province of Pennsylvania
Samuel Van Leer (1747–1825), a captain in the American Revolutionary War
Isaac Van Leer (1772-1821), ironworks owner
Carlos Clark Van Leer (1865–1953), military officer
Anthony Wayne Van Leer (1783-1864), ironworks owner
John P. Van Leer (1825-1862), a colonel in the Union Army during the American Civil War
Antoinette Van Leer Polk (1847-1919), Baroness de Charette
Florence Van Leer Earle Coates (1850–1927), poet
George Howard Earle Jr. (1856-1928), lawyer and businessman
George Howard Earle III (1890-1974), Governor of Pennsylvania and diplomat
Ralph Earle (1928-2020), Ambassador and arms control negotiator
VanLeer Polk (1858-1907), Tennessee state senator
Carlos Clark Van Leer (1865-1953), United States Army Officer and Chief at the United States Department of the Treasury
Blake Ragsdale Van Leer (1893-1956), president of Georgia Institute of Technology
Blake Wayne Van Leer (1926-1997), U.S. Navy officer
Maryly Van Leer Peck (1930-2011), academician and college administrator
David Van Leer (1949-2013), academician and LGBT cultural studies researcher

Historical properties
Barnardus Van Leer House
Broadview VanLeer Mansion
Hibernia House
Mortonson-Van Leer Log Cabin
Reading Furnace Historic District
Van Leer Cabin
Van Leer Pleasant Hill Plantation

Family tree

References

German-American history
Van Leer family